Gerry Enright (born 1966) is an Irish Gaelic footballer who plays as a goalkeeper for the Tipperary senior team.

Born in Cahir, County Tipperary, Enright first arrived on the inter-county scene at the age of sixteen when he first linked up with the Tipperary minor team before later joining the under-21 side. Enright joined the senior panel during the 1986 championship.

At club level Enright played with Cahir.

He retired from inter-county football following the conclusion of the 2003 championship.

Honours

Player

Tipperary
McGrath Cup (1): 1989
Munster Minor Football Championship (1): 1984

References

1955 births
Living people
Cahir Gaelic footballers
Tipperary inter-county Gaelic footballers